Choco-Story Brussels, formerly known as the Museum of Cocoa and Chocolate is a privately owned museum in Brussels, Belgium, established in 1998 at the initiative of Gabrielle Draps, the wife of a famous Belgian chocolate artisan Joseph "Jo" Draps, founder of the Godiva Chocolatier.

History
The Museum of Cocoa and Chocolate was founded in July 1998 on the initiative of Gabrielle Draps. Gabrielle Draps represented the third generation of a Belgian chocolate artisans and was married to the founder of the Godiva chocolate manufacturer, Joseph "Jo" Draps.

The museum was originally housed in a house dating from 1697, formerly called the De Valck building, at 9–11, /, just off the Grand-Place (Brussels' main square). It spanned three exhibition floors. The museum's management was taken over by Gabrielle Draps' daughter, Peggy van Lierde, in 2007. 

In May 2014, the museum was renamed "Choco-Story Brussels" following the association of the Van Lierde-Draps family with the Van Belle family, already owner of Choco-Story Bruges, the Bruges Chocolate Museum.

In 2021 the Van Belle family applied for permission to convert the museum's former building in Rue de la Tête d'Or into a museum of French fries.

The museum provides demonstrations and tastings, and visitors can book a workshop to make chocolate bars and lollipops.

Gallery

References

Notes

Bibliography

External links 
 Official museum website

Museums in Brussels
Chocolateries
Chocolate museums